Tariq Mahmood was a Pakistani lawyer and judge. Born in Pakistan, he is most famous as a leader of the Lawyers' Movement in Pakistan.

As a judge of the Balochistan High Court, he refused to take an oath under General Pervez Musharraf. He lived in Quetta for a while.

Mahmood was also the former president of Supreme Court Bar Association of Pakistan.

He was also in the panel of lawyers of Chief Justice Iftikhar Chaudhry's suspension case of presidential reference in the Supreme Judicial Council of Pakistan. He was arrested and detained with his family during the 2007 state of emergency.

Justice Tariq frequently appears on a number of popular TV talk news shows and is known for his candid and honest views.

Quotes 
 Either I could lie to save my job, or tell the truth to save my character.

See also 
 Pakistan Bar Council (PBC)

External links
 Movement for Rule of Law - Profile - Justice Tariq
 Justice Tariq's Interview taken in May 2002

Pakistani lawyers
Judges of the Balochistan High Court
People from Quetta
Living people
Pakistani legal scholars
Year of birth missing (living people)
Presidents of the Supreme Court Bar Association of Pakistan